Come By Chance may refer to:

Come By Chance, New South Wales, Australia
Come By Chance, Newfoundland and Labrador, Canada

See also
Come By Chance Refinery